NCGA may refer to:

 National Collegiate Gymnastics Association
 National Cooperative Grocers Association
 National Corn Growers Association
 North Carolina General Assembly
 North Carolina Growers Association
 Northern California Golf Association
 National Council on Governmental Accounting, predecessor of the Governmental Accounting Standards Board (GASB)